Uncle Walter may refer to:

"Uncle Walter" (song), a song from Ben Folds Five's 1995 self-titled debut album
A nickname for broadcast journalist Walter Cronkite
A Minnesota colloquial phrase for a Walleye